Strathmore Football Club was a Scottish association football club based in the city of Dundee. The club was founded in 1874 and disbanded in 1894 when the club merged with Johnstone Wanderers to form Dundee Wanderers. The club competed in the Scottish Cup for 12 seasons between 1879 and 1891. From 1884, the club's home colours were black and white hooped shirts with navy blue shorts.

References 

Defunct football clubs in Scotland
Association football clubs established in 1874
1874 establishments in Scotland
Association football clubs disestablished in 1894
1894 disestablishments in Scotland
Football clubs in Dundee
Dundee Wanderers F.C.